Tan Chui Mui (born 1978) is a Malaysian filmmaker, film producer and director.

Background 
Tan was born in Sungai Ular, a small fishing village in Kuantan, Malaysia. Her father is from Kinmen, Taiwan. She graduated with a Bachelor of Multimedia (Hons) in Film and Animation in 2002 from Multimedia University, Malaysia.

Career 
Wang Ge of Time Out Beijing identifies Tan Chui Mui of being at the forefront of a new wave of Malaysian filmmakers who deal with social issues. In 2007, she received the Tiger Award from the 36th International Film Festival Rotterdam with her debut feature film Love Conquers All. The film had previously won the New Currents Awards and Fipresci Award at the 11th Pusan International Film Festival in 2006.  In 2010, Year Without a Summer was selected for the Asian Cinema Fund, receiving funding for both the script and post-production. She is also a prolific short filmmaker, who had won prizes in two short film festivals, Oberhausen Short Film Festival and Clermont-Ferrand Short film Festival.  In 2008, she had a project of making a short film every month. She had made 7 short films, and she called them All My Failed Attempts.  In 2010, she was a judge at the Malaysia Airlines short film competition.

She has been actively involved in the Malaysia independent film scene, working as a producer, editor, script writer, and occasionally an actress. In 2004, she set up Da Huang Pictures with Amir Muhammad, James Lee and Liew Seng Tat.

Filmography

References

External links 
 
 Da Huang Pictures

Malaysian film directors
Malaysian film producers
1978 births
Living people
Malaysian people of Hokkien descent
Malaysian people of Chinese descent
Malaysian people of Taiwanese descent
Malaysian documentary film producers
Malaysian women experimental filmmakers
Women documentary filmmakers